Javier 'Javi' López Muñoz (born 16 October 1990) is a Spanish professional footballer who most recently played for Jammerbugt FC as a forward.

Football career
Born in El Carpio, Province of Córdoba, Andalusia, López finished his graduation with local UD Almería, and made his senior debuts in the 2008–09 season with the reserves, in the Tercera División. In the following four seasons he played in the fourth level, representing CD Pozoblanco, Real Ávila CF, UD Marinaleda and Córdoba CF B.

On 3 September 2011 López first appeared with the latter's Cordoba's first team, playing the last 24 minutes of a 0–2 away loss against Real Valladolid in the Segunda División.

In July 2013, the free agent López signed with Écija Balompié of the Segunda División B. The following January he moved to fellow third-tier team Badajoz CF.

López signed with Danish club Jammerbugt FC in August 2018, but left the club again at the end of the year.

References

External links

Javier López at La Prefente

1990 births
Living people
Sportspeople from the Province of Córdoba (Spain)
Spanish footballers
Footballers from Andalusia
Association football forwards
Segunda División players
Segunda División B players
Tercera División players
UD Almería B players
Córdoba CF B players
Córdoba CF players
Écija Balompié players
Arenas Club de Getxo footballers
Arandina CF players
CD Badajoz players